"5 Seconds Before Sunrise" is an instrumental composition by Dutch disc jockey and producer Tiësto under his alias VER:WEST. It was released on 17 July 2020 in the Netherlands.

Background and release 
The composition was premiered at Tomorrowland 2020 during an exclusive VER:WEST one hour set. The title is a reference to his previous 2007 composition, "Ten Seconds Before Sunrise". Tiësto declared about the song : "I would describe VER:WEST as melodic house music. It’s a lot deeper and more chill and a very different energy than Tiësto. I got this opportunity from Tomorrowland to express a different side of me, which I’ve never done before. I know they are going to put amazing visuals around it and make it look really different and cool. Expect the unexpected, it’s going to look amazing!"

Track listing 
Digital Download (AH77)
 "5 Seconds Before Sunrise" - 4:35

Digital Download (AH77)
 "5 Seconds Before Sunrise" (Extended Mix)  - 7:23

Charts

References 

2020 songs
2020 singles
Tiësto songs
Songs written by Tiësto